HD 92063 is a single star in the southern constellation of Carina. It has the Bayer designation t1 Carinae, while HD 92063 is the star's identifier from the Henry Draper Catalogue. This is a suspected variable star and is visible to the naked eye with an apparent visual magnitude of 5.08. The star is located at a distance of approximately 246 light years from the Sun based on parallax, but is drifting closer with a radial velocity of −10 km/s. Although it appears at the edge of the Carina Nebula, it is much closer than the nebula. It is also not considered a member of the nearby Alessi 5 open cluster of stars.

This is an aging K-type giant star with a stellar classification of K1III, having exhausted the supply of hydrogen at its core then cooled and expanded off the main sequence. At present it has 14 times the radius of the Sun. The star is radiating 72 times the Sun's luminosity from its enlarged photosphere at an effective temperature of 4,520 K.

References

External links
 

K-type giants
Carina (constellation)
Carinae, t1
Durchmusterung objects
092063
051912
4164
Suspected variables